Bourgogne is the French name of Burgundy, one of the 26 regions of France.

Bourgogne may also refer to:

Places
 Bourgogne, Marne, a commune of the Marne department in northeastern France
 Bourgogne (Casablanca), a quartier of Casablanca, Morocco
 Duchy of Burgundy, a historical French duchy situated in eastern France and parts of modern-day Belgium

Ships
 French ship Bourgogne (1767), a 74-gun ship of the line of the French Navy
 French ship Duc de Bourgogne (1752), an 80-gun ship of the line of the French Navy
 SS La Bourgogne, a French ocean liner, which sank in 1898
 French submarine Casabianca (S603), formerly the Bourgogne

Wine grapes
Several wine grapes have gone by the name of Bourgogne including:

 Canari noir
 Enfariné noir
 Melon de Bourgogne
 Négrette

See also

 Burgoyne (disambiguation)
 Burgundy (disambiguation)